Özlem Çarıkçıoğlu (born 11 January 1994) is a Turkish alpine skier, who competed at the 2018 and 2022 Winter Olympics.

Personal life
Özlem Çarıkçıoğlu was born in Sakarya, Turkey on 11 January 1994. After completing her high school education at Robert College, she studied Industrial Engineering at Koç University in Istanbul. Aside from skiing, Çarıkçıoğlu practices ballet.

Sports career
At the age of eight, Çarıkçıoğlu made acquaintance  with skiing during a winter camp at Uludağ in Bursa held by her primary school. She is a member of the AKUT Search and Rescue Association, and competed for the AKUT sports Club's Snow Sports Branch.

She competed at the 2011 European Youth Olympic Winter Festival. She took part in the Alpine skiing Women's giant slalom and Women's slalom events at the 2015 Winter Universiade held in the Sierra Nevada Ski Station, Canada. She competed in the Alpine skiing Women's Giant slalom (37th place) and Women's slalom (did not finish) events at the 2017 Winter Universiade in Almaty, Kazakhstan. 

Çarıkçıoğlu competed at the 2018 Winter Olympics, where she was the only Turkish female alpine skier. She missed one event at the Games due to a fever. She was one of seven Turkish athletes at the 2022 Winter Olympics, and was the oldest Turkish competitor at the Games. She placed 49th in the slalom discipline.

See also
Turkey at the 2018 Winter Olympics
Turkey at the 2022 Winter Olympics

References

External links 

1994 births
Living people
People from Sakarya Province
Robert College alumni
Koç University alumni
Turkish female alpine skiers
Olympic alpine skiers of Turkey
Alpine skiers at the 2018 Winter Olympics
Alpine skiers at the 2022 Winter Olympics
21st-century Turkish women